Teed Pond is a small lake located north-northeast of the hamlet of Loomis in Delaware County, New York. It drains south via Loomis Brook which flows into the Cannonsville Reservoir.

See also
 List of lakes in New York

References 

Lakes of New York (state)
Lakes of Delaware County, New York